The Lison–Lamballe railway is an important 205.7-kilometre long railway line that runs between the French commune of Lison and the town of Lamballe. It is used for passenger (express, regional and suburban) and freight traffic. The railway was opened in several stages between 1860 and 1879.

Main stations
 Lison station
 Saint-Lô station
 Folligny station
 Dol-de-Bretagne station
 Dinan station
 Lamballe station

Line history

The line was opened in several stages between 1860 and 1879.

References

Railway lines in Normandy
Railway lines in Brittany
Railway lines opened in 1860